"We Got the Power" is a song by Swedish singer Loreen. The song was written by Ester Dean and Geoff Earley. It was released in Sweden as a digital download by Warner Music Sweden on 15 May 2013. She performed the song during the final of the Eurovision Song Contest 2013. The song was included as the fourth overall single from the reissue of Loreen's debut studio album Heal.

Live performances
On May 18, 2013, Loreen performed the song for the first time live during the final of the Eurovision Song Contest 2013, she also performed her 2012 Eurovision winning song "Euphoria" and "My Heart Is Refusing Me".

Music video
The official music video premiered on June 5 on Loreen's official YouTube channel and it was directed by herself with Charli Ljung as cinematographer.

Track listing

Chart performance

Certifications

Release history

References

Loreen (singer) songs
2012 songs
2013 singles
Songs written by Ester Dean
Warner Music Group singles